Mendez, et al v. Westminister [sic] School District of Orange County, et al, 64 F.Supp. 544 (S.D. Cal. 1946), aff'd, 161 F.2d 774 (9th Cir. 1947) (en banc), was a 1947 federal court case that challenged Mexican remedial schools in four districts in Orange County, California. In its ruling, the United States Court of Appeals for the Ninth Circuit, in an en banc decision, held that the forced segregation of Mexican American students into separate "Mexican schools" was unconstitutional because as US District Court Judge Paul J. McCormick stated, "The evidence clearly shows that Spanish-speaking children are retarded in learning English by lack of exposure to its use because of segregation, and that commingling of the entire student body instills and develops a common cultural attitude among the school children which is imperative for the perpetuation of American institutions and ideals." The Judge further ruled that, "The equal protection of the laws pertaining to the public school system in California is not provided by furnishing in separate schools the same technical facilities, textbooks and courses of instruction to children of Mexican ancestry that are available to the other public school children regardless of their ancestry. A paramount requisite in the American system of public education is social equality. It must be open to all children by unified school association regardless of lineage."

Background

Mexican Americans, who were then considered to be white, were unaffected by legal segregation and normally attended segregated white schools. The Mendez family, who previously went to white schools without problems, suddenly found their children forced into separate "Schools for Mexicans" when they came to Westminster, even though that was not the norm and it was not legally sanctioned by the state. In the 1940s, a small minority of school districts began to establish separate language-based "Mexican Schools", arguing that Mexican children had special needs because they were Spanish speakers. The schools existed only for elementary children (K-4) and were intended to prepare them for mainstream schools. But, since many districts began arbitrarily forcing Mexican elementary school children into "Mexican Schools" irrespective of language ability, it became a form of unlawful discrimination that was superficially similar to legalized racial segregation.

Five Mexican-American fathers (Thomas Estrada, William Guzman, Gonzalo Mendez, Frank Palomino, and Lorenzo Ramirez) challenged the practice of Mexican school segregation in the United States District Court for the Central District of California, in Los Angeles. They claimed that their children, along with 5,000 other children of "Mexican" ancestry, were victims of unconstitutional discrimination by being forced to attend separate "schools for Mexicans" in the Westminster, Garden Grove, Santa Ana, and El Modena school districts of Orange County. Mexicans were not in separate schools elsewhere in California. 

Soledad Vidaurri went to the Westminster Elementary School District to enroll her children and those of her brother Gonzalo Mendez: Gonzalo, Geronimo, and Sylvia. The Westminster School informed Vidaurri that her children could be admitted to the school. However, Gonzalo, Geronimo, and Sylvia could not be admitted on the basis of their skin color. (Vidaurri's children had light complexions and Basque surnames and so would not be segregated into a different school.) Upon hearing the news, Vidaurri refused to admit her children to the school if her brother's children were not admitted as well. The parents, Gonzalo and Felicitas Mendez, tried to arrange for Geronimo, Gonzalo, and Sylvia to attend the school by talking to the school administration, but both parties were not able to reach an agreement.

Gonzalo dedicated the next year to a lawsuit against the Westminster School District of Orange County. The school district offered to compromise by allowing the Mendez children to attend the elementary school without any other students of Mexican-American descent.

The Mendez family declined the offer and continued the lawsuit. The Mendez family believed in helping out the entire Mexican community, instead of a handful of children. The Mendez family covered most of the expenses for the various witnesses that would be present in the case.

The plaintiffs were represented by established Jewish American civil rights attorney David Marcus. Funding for the lawsuit was primarily paid for initially by the lead plaintiff Gonzalo Mendez, who began the lawsuit when his three children were denied admission to their local Westminster school.

Senior District Judge Paul J. McCormick, sitting in Los Angeles, presided at the trial and ruled in favor of Mendez and his co-plaintiffs on February 18, 1946 in finding that separate schools for Mexicans to be an unconstitutional denial of equal protection. The school district appealed to the Ninth Federal Circuit Court of Appeals in San Francisco, which upheld Judge McCormick's decision, finding that the segregation practices violated the Fourteenth Amendment. Although the case was a victory for the families affected, it was narrowly focused on the small number of Mexican remedial schools in question and did not challenge legal race segregation in California or elsewhere. After Mendez, racial minorities were still subject to legal segregation in schools and public places.

Aftermath
Governor Earl Warren, who would later become Chief Justice of the United States, signed a law outlawing segregation only where it was not legal - he did not end legal segregation for non-white minorities in California.

Several organizations joined the appellate case as amicus curiae, including the NAACP, represented by Thurgood Marshall and Robert L. Carter and the Japanese American Citizens League (JACL). More than a year later, on April 14, 1947, the United States Court of Appeals for the Ninth Circuit affirmed the district court's ruling but not on equal protection grounds. It did not challenge the "separate but equal" interpretation of the Fourteenth Amendment that had been announced by the Supreme Court in Plessy v. Ferguson in 1896. Instead, the Ninth Circuit held that the segregation was not racially based, but it had been implemented by the school districts without being specifically authorized by state law, and it was thus impermissible irrespective of Plessy.

George L. Sanchez, who worked on the case, was asked if the Mendez decision could have any influence on Brown v. Board of Education, and he exclaimed "No, there is no connection!". Unlike Brown, Mendez never sought to challenge legal segregation in itself. The overriding issue in Mendez was that Mexicans were white children who were being arbitrarily segregated from other whites in the absence of any state or federal law for their alleged language handicap. "Does the present case attack Negro segregation where there is no law decreeing such segregation? Only in such a case would we be concerned." Since segregation for African-American children was legal, that was not of their concern in Mendez, and made the cases ultimately unrelated.

Legacy

On December 8, 1997, the Santa Ana Unified School District dedicated the Gonzalo and Felicitas Mendez Intermediate Fundamental School in Santa Ana, California.

In 2003, writer/producer Sandra Robbie received an Emmy Award for her documentary Mendez vs. Westminster: For All the Children / Para Todos los Niños.

On September 14, 2007, the US Postal Service honored the 60th anniversary of the ruling with a 41-cent commemorative stamp. On November 15, 2007, it presented the Mendez v. Westminster stamp to the Mendez family, at a press conference at the Rose Center Theater in Westminster, California.

In September 2009, Felicitas and Gonzalo Mendez High School opened in Boyle Heights. The school was named after Felicitas and Gonzalo Mendez, parents of American civil rights activist Sylvia Mendez, who played an instrumental role in the case.

On October 14, 2009, Chapman University's Leatherby Libraries dedicated the Mendez et al v. Westminster et al Group Study Room and a collection of documents, video and other items relating to the landmark desegregation case. Chapman also owns the last standing Mexican school building from the segregation era in Orange County.

On February 15, 2011, President Barack Obama awarded the Presidential Medal of Freedom to Sylvia Mendez, the daughter of Gonzalo Mendez, the lead plaintiff in the lawsuit. She, along with her two brothers, Gonzalo, Jr. and Jerome, were some of the Mexican-American students who were denied admission to their local Westminster school, which formed the basis for the suit. Sylvia was awarded the honor for her many years of work encouraging students to stay in school and to ensure that the importance of Mendez v. Westminster in American history will not be forgotten.

In September 2011, the Museum of Teaching and Learning (MOTAL), in partnership with a half-dozen government agencies and universities, opened a nine-month exhibition about the case at the Old Orange County Courthouse in Santa Ana, California. The exhibition, for which the team won a 2013 Award of Merit from the American Association for State and Local History, continues to travel to other locations to educate the public, both adults and students, about the details around this landmark case.

See also
 LULAC
 Gebhart v. Belton
 Tape v. Hurley Lemon Grove Incident
 Parents v. Seattle
 Hernandez v. Texas
 Del Rio ISD v. Salvatierra
 Maestas vs. George H. Shone
 Brown v. Board of Education

Sources
The reported opinions of Judge McCormick and the Ninth Circuit, Mendez v. Westminster [sic] School Dist. of Orange County, 64 F.Supp. 544 (S.D. Cal. 1946), aff'd, 161 F.2d 774 (9th Cir. 1947) (en banc).All Deliberate Speed  UC Press (1976), Charles Wollenberg.  Each chapter provides a detailed history of the various non-white ethnic groups and their educational struggles in California.
"Knocking on the Schoolhouse Door"  8 La Raza Law Journal 166 (1995), Christopher Arriola.  A look at one town involved in the lawsuit, El Modena, and an examination of the appellate briefs used in the case.Chicano Education in the Era of Segregation  UCI Press, (1992) Gilbert Gonzalez.  A sociological history of Mexican School Segregation in the Southwest.The Devil in Silicon Valley: Northern California, Race, and Mexican Americans Princeton University Press (2004) Stephen J. Pitti.  A look at the history of Chicanos in San Jose, CA.The Barrios of Santa Ana Dissertation published by the University of Michigan Press (1985), Mary Lisbeth Haas.  A complete history of the Mexican Community in Santa Ana, CA, up to 1948.
"Chicanos in California" Materials for Today's Learning (1990), Albert Camarillo.  A short, concise history of Chicanos in California.
David S. Ettinger, The History of School Desegregation in the Ninth Circuit, 12 Loyola of Los Angeles Law Review 481, 484–487 (1979)
"The Mexican American Struggle for Equal Educational Opportunity in Mendez v. Westminster: Helping to Pave the Way for Brown v. The Board of Education".  Richard Valencia, Teacher's College Record, Vol. 107, Number 3, March 2005, p 389.
Philippa Strum, Mendez v. Westminster : school desegregation and Mexican-American rights, Lawrence, Kan., University Press of Kansas, c2010.
Sandra Robbie, Mendez vs. Westminster: For All the Children / Para Todos los Ninos''. A Sandra Robbie production, c2002.

References

Further reading

External links
 
 
 
 
  Law Library of Congress
  Law Library of Congress

School segregation in the United States
United States Court of Appeals for the Ninth Circuit cases
History of Latino civil rights
1947 in United States case law
1947 in education
Legal history of California
Westminster, California
United States school desegregation case law
History of racism in California
History of education in California
Hispanic and Latino American history of California
History of Orange County, California